Larry Stewart may refer to:
Larry Stewart (basketball) (born 1968), retired American basketball player
Larry Stewart (philanthropist) (1948–2007), American philanthropist from Kansas City
Larry Stewart (singer) (born 1959), lead singer of the band Restless Heart

See also
Larry Stuart (disambiguation)